Bayanchub (also Romanized as Bāyanchūb, Bāīnchūb, Bayan Choob, and Bāyenchūb; also known as Baiānchū and Bayānchū) is a village in Hoseynabad-e Jonubi Rural District, in the Central District of Sanandaj County, Kurdistan Province, Iran. At the 2006 census, its population was 956, in 228 families. The village is populated by Kurds.

References 

Towns and villages in Sanandaj County
Kurdish settlements in Kurdistan Province